The 1947–48 Scottish Division B was won by East Fife who, along with second placed Albion Rovers, were promoted to the Division A. Leith Athletic finished bottom and were relegated.

Table

References 

 Scottish Football Archive

Scottish Division Two seasons
2
Scot